New Palangdharma Party ( NDP , พธม.) is a political party in Thailand that launched in March 2018 by former secretary-general of the original Palang Dharma party, Ravee Maschamadol and other member of now defunct party though its founder, Chamlong Srimuang did not join, citing his retirement from politics. The party was also joined by many former members of Mahachon party and New Aspiration party.

In 2019 general elections, the party stood in 134 constituencies and 24 party-list candidates with only one elected to the house. After government formation talks, New Palangdharma along with other 10 single-member party join a 19-party coalition led by Palang Pracharath Party.

Election results

See also
 Palang Dharma Party

References

Political parties established in 2018

Political parties in Thailand
2018 establishments in Thailand
Buddhist political parties